Halofilum is a Gram-negative and facultative anaerobic  genus of bacteria from the family of Ectothiorhodospiraceae with one known species (Halofilum ochraceum). Halofilum ochraceum has been isolated from a marine solar saltern from the coast of Weihai in China.

References

Chromatiales
Bacteria genera
Monotypic bacteria genera
Taxa described in 2017